Mercaston Hall is a 16th-century timber framed farmhouse near Ashbourne, Derbyshire, England. It is a Grade II listed building.

The Kniveton family owned Mercaston from the 14th century. They were Kniveton Baronets from 1611 and several members of the family served as High Sheriff of Derbyshire.

The present modest structure, altered in the 19th century, is thought to occupy the site of a former larger property. The present owners offer bed and breakfast accommodation.

See also
Listed buildings in Mercaston

References

Grade II listed buildings in Derbyshire
Country houses in Derbyshire